Meurman is a surname. Notable people with the surname include:

Arne Meurman (born 1956), Swedish mathematician
Kristian Meurman (born 1979), Finnish singer
Otto-Iivari Meurman (1890–1994), Finnish architect